Gubernatorial elections in 1991 and 1992 took place in 11 federal subjects of Russia. Moscow, Saint Petersburg, Tatarstan, Kalmykia, Mari El, Mordovia, Sakha and Chuvashia held their first elections in 1991. In Adygea and Kabardino-Balkaria second tours were held after the New Year celebrations. Tuva was the only one region of the Russian Federation to held its first presidential election in 1992, ignoring the year-long moratorium introduced by Russian parliament in late 1991.

In Adygea, Mari El, Tatarstan and Sakha, the language qualification was applied at the elections, that is, the candidates were required to know the language of the titular ethnic group.

Background 
In 1990, a fundamentally important reform took place: the speakers of the regional Supreme Councils (in the republics) and the chairmen of the Soviets of People's Deputies (in oblasts, krais, autonomous okrugs and federal cities) became senior officials instead of the first secretaries of the CPSU local committees.

After the August putsch of 1991, Russian President Boris Yeltsin signed a decree "On the issues of the activities of executive authorities." According to this document, regional administrations with Head of administration as the senior official in the region. Heads of administrations were appointed and removed from office by the president. However, this rule did not apply to autonomous republics where the highest official was elected directly by voters or by deputies of local parliaments (In 1991, elections were held in 8 of 21 republics). On 24 October 1991, the Supreme Soviet of Russia adopted the law "On the election of the head of administration" and scheduled the elections in a number of Russian regions for December 8 of the same year.

However a week later, on November 1, the Congress of People's Deputies introduced a moratorium on gubernatorial elections until December 1992 and approved the president's right to appoint regional leaders.

Race summary

Moscow 

Election of the Mayor and Vice Mayor of Moscow were held on 12 June 1991 simultaneously with the election of the President of the RSFSR. Chairman of the Moscow City Council Gavriil Popov won earning 65% of the vote. In June 1992 Popov resigned and his vice mayor, former chairman of the city executive committee Yury Luzhkov succeeded him.

Former chairman of executive committee of the Moscow City Council Valery Saykin, Chairman of Sevastopolsky District council Aleksey Bryachikhin, Head of Spektr scientific production association Vladimir Klyuyev were the opponents of Popov-Luzhkov ticket.

Leningrad 

Election of the Mayor of Leningrad were held on 12 June 1991 simultaneously with the election of the President of the RSFSR. Chairman of Leningrad City Council Anatoly Sobchak won with 66% of the vote, representing the democratic anti-communist forces. Sobchak's only rival was Yuri Sevenard, member of the Leningrad City Council, director of Lengidroenergospetsstroy industrial construction association. Three month later Leningrad was officially renamed Saint Petersburg following a referendum.

Tatarstan 

Presidential elections in Tatarstan were held on 12 June 1991 simultaneously with the election of the President of Russia. Chairman of the Supreme Soviet of Tatar Soviet Socialist Republic Mintimer Shaymiyev ran uncontested, earning 70.6% of the vote. On July 4 Shaymiyev was sworn in as the first president of Tatarstan.

Kalmykia 
The first presidential election in Kalmykia was held on 19 October and 3 November 1991. 62.7% of the population participated in the first tour and 57.6% in the second tour. Neither of three candidates, chairman of the Council of Ministers Batyr Mikhailov,  Supreme Soviet chairman Vladimir Basanov or head of Chernozemelsky District administration Vladimir Chumudov could reach 50% of the vote in first round or in the runoff, as the laws required.

Next elections were held in April 1993 with Kirsan Ilyumzhinov becoming President of Kalmykia.

Chechnya 

The presidential elections in self-proclaimed Chechen Republic of Ichkeria were held on 27 October 1991. Dzhokhar Dudayev was proclaimed the winner. Elections were scheduled by the "All-National Congress of the Chechen People", which seized power in eastern portions of falling apart Republic of Checheno-Ingushetia. According to official statements, 72% of the adult population of Chechnya came to the precincts, and 90.1% of them voted for Dudayev. Russian-speaking population of Chechnya did not take part in the voting. The Provisional Supreme Council and the Council of Ministers of Checheno-Ingushetia declared elections rigged and refused to recognize their results.

On November 2, the Congress of People's Deputies of Russia refused to recognize the election results. An attempt was made to introduce a state of emergency in Checheno-Ingushetia, but this attempt was unsuccessful. The following year, Russian troops were withdrawn from the republic and Dudayev's secessionist government obtained full power over Chechnya until the First Chechen war broke out in 1994.

Mari El 

The first round was held on 8 December 1991. No candidate won a majority. Chairman of the Supreme Soviet Vladislav Zotin became the first President of Mari El Republic after winning in the runoff on 15 December. His opponents were historian Aleksandr Kazimov and director of Yoshkar-Ola shoe factory Anatoly Popov, affiliated with Mari Ushem movement.

Chuvashia 
 in Chuvashia were held on 8 December 1991. Former communist nomenklatura was represented by Leonid Prokopyev, former chairman of the Chuvash SSR council of ministers (1975–89). He won a plurality in the first round, surpassing activist of "Chuvash National Revival" movement, member of the Supreme Soviet Atner Khuzangai, Chairman of the Supreme Soviet Eduard Kubarev and leader of agricultural workers' union Pyotr Ivantayev. To win in the runoff, which held on 22 December 1991, a candidate needed to gather more than 50% of the vote. As neither Prokopyev, nor Khuzangai won, the presidency remained vacant until December 1993, when former Justice Minister of Russia Nikolay Fyodorov won the recall election.

Mordovia 
In 1990, a democratic movement developed in Mordovia, which consisted of the predominantly ethnic Russian urban middle class. The democrats went on a struggle with the CPSU's nomenklatura, mostly of Erzyan ethnicity.

On 25 October 1991 the post of President of Mordovia was introduced by the decree of the Supreme Soviet of the republic. Members of the current government acted as competitors to each other during the campaign, while Vasily Guslyannikov, the leader of the local branch of Democratic Russia, was presented as the only democrat opposing the continuation of nomenklatura's reign. Guslyannikov won the presidential election, which held on December 14 and 22, 1991.

Other candidates were: Deputy Chairmen of the council of ministers Pavel Gruznov and Mikhail Kovshov, other regional officials Nikolay Merkushkin and Sergey Sorokin, and rector of the Mordovian State University Nikolay Makarkin.

Sakha 

Presidential elections in Sakha (Yakutia) were held on 20 December 1991. Chairman of the Supreme Soviet Mikhail Nikolayev won 3/4 of the vote, running in pair with construction and investment minister Vyacheslav Shtyrov. Deputy Chairman of the Council of Ministers Ivan Cherov was Nikolayev's only opponent.

Adygea 

The first round was held on 22 December 1991. None of the six candidates could reach 50% of the vote. Chairman of the Supreme Soviet of Adygea Aslan Dzharimov won the presidency defeating associate professor Pshimaf Khakuz of Krasnodar Polytechnic Institute in a runoff which held on 5 January 1992. Other candidates were people's deputy of Russia Aslanbiy Khutyz, deputy chairman of Maykop City Council Boris Merzakulov and director of Adygea Pedagogical College Kazbek Achmiz.

Kabardino-Balkaria 
The first round was held on 22 December 1991. None of the four candidates could reach 50% of the vote. The second round was scheduled on 5 January 1992. Deputy chairman of the Council of Ministers of Kabardino-Balkaria Valery Kokov ran uncontested after trucking company director Felix Kharayev withdrew his candidacy. Chairman of the Supreme Soviet Khachim Karmokov placed third and did not qualify for the runoff.

The Balkars massively boycotted the elections in pursuance of the decision of the "Congress of the Balkar People". This meeting in November 1991 proclaimed the creation of the "Republic of Balkaria" and formed the "National Council of the Balkar People". Sufiyan Beppayev, deputy commander of the Transcaucasian Military District, was elected its chairman.

The council decided to hold a "referendum" on December 29 among the Balkars on the creation of a new autonomous republic. Voting was organized not only in majority-Balkar settlements, but also in Nalchik. The positive expression of the will of the majority of Balkars and their subsequent boycott of the presidential elections (polling stations were not even opened in Balkar villages) allowed the national activists to deny Valery Kokov's right to be called the president of Kabardino-Balkaria.

Tuva 

Presidential elections in Tuva were held on 15 March 1992 despite the moratorium established by the Congress of People's Deputies of Russia. Tuva was proclaimed a sovereign state, the supremacy of Russian laws was denied until 2000 revision of the Constitution of Tuva.

Chairman of the Council of Ministers Sherig-ool Oorzhak secured his election after reaching an informal agreement with People's Front of Tuva chairman Kaadyr-ool Bicheldey. Oorzhak won with 83.2% of the vote cast. Member of the "People's Party of Sovereign Tuva" Bair Sanchi was his only opponent present on ballot. He collected 9.6% of the vote.

See also 
 Parade of sovereignties

References

Sources 

Gubernatorial elections in Russia
gubernatorial
gubernatorial